Bradley Thomas Symes (born 7 March 1985) is an Australian rules football midfielder who was selected by the Port Adelaide at Pick 30 of the 2003 AFL draft.

AFL career

Port Adelaide career (2004–2007)
He made his Australian Football League (AFL) debut for Port Adelaide in Round 8, 2004. Despite solid performances for his South Australian National Football League (SANFL) club, Central District, Symes struggled to get an AFL game for Port Adelaide.  His form was finally rewarded in 2006, in which he impressed greatly with his composure and skills and received a nomination for the 2006 AFL Rising Star Award for his round nine match against Essendon, and kicked his first goal in Round 13, 2006 against Melbourne after a trademark tackle on Jared Rivers that won him a free kick close to goal.

Symes drifted back in the pecking order in 2007, playing only seven games despite continued good performances in the SANFL. He was called up for the 2007 AFL Grand Final after veteran defender Michael Wilson snapped his Achilles tendon in the previous game, but Port Adelaide had a largely forgettable day, losing to Geelong by 119 points.

Adelaide career (2008–2012)
The following Sunday, (after the loss) he played in a successful grand final for Central District in the SANFL, but remained disgruntled by his lack of opportunities in the AFL.  As a likely result of this, he was traded to the Adelaide Crows in exchange for draft pick No. 28 on Friday 12 October, the final day of the AFL trade week.

Initially in and out of the team, by 2009 Symes had developed into a regular member of the Adelaide Crows' lineup, playing as a running defender.  He was best known for his run off half back and through the centre, an integral part of Adelaide's play, and for his ferocious tackling.

In 2012, Symes only played two games for Adelaide, but had a standout year in the SANFL, jointly winning the Magarey Medal with South Adelaide Football Club's Joel Cross with 18 votes, although Symes' teammate James Boyd polled the most votes (26), but was ineligible due to a two-week suspension for striking.

He was delisted from Adelaide in September 2012.

Statistics
 Statistics are correct to end of 2012 season.

|- style="background-color: #EAEAEA"
! scope="row" style="text-align:center" | 2004
|  || 23 || 1 || 0 || 0 || 2 || 1 || 3 || 1 || 0 || 0.0 || 0.0 || 2.0 || 1.0 || 3.0 || 1.0 || 0.0
|- 
! scope="row" style="text-align:center" | 2005
|  || 23 || 0 || 0 || 0 || 0 || 0 || 0 || 0 || 0 || 0 || 0 || 0 || 0 || 0 || 0 || 0
|- style="background-color: #EAEAEA"
! scope="row" style="text-align:center" | 2006
|  || 23 || 12 || 1 || 1 || 123 || 123 || 246 || 95 || 34 || 0.1 || 0.1 || 10.2 || 10.2 || 20.5 || 7.9 || 2.8
|-
! scope="row" style="text-align:center" | 2007
|  || 23 || 7 || 1 || 1 || 59 || 51 || 110 || 36 || 17 || 0.1 || 0.1 || 8.4 || 7.3 || 15.7 || 5.1 || 2.4
|- style="background-color: #EAEAEA"
! scope="row" style="text-align:center" | 2008
|  || 15 || 16 || 2 || 5 || 147 || 182 || 329 || 75 || 60 || 0.1 || 0.3 || 9.2 || 11.4 || 20.6 || 4.7 || 3.8
|- 
! scope="row" style="text-align:center" | 2009
|  || 15 || 20 || 3 || 6 || 181 || 243 || 424 || 104 || 67 || 0.2 || 0.3 || 12.2 || 9.0 || 21.2 || 5.2 || 3.4
|- style="background-color: #EAEAEA"
! scope="row" style="text-align:center" | 2010
|  || 15 || 11 || 1 || 1 || 110 || 131 || 241 || 59 || 44 || 0.1 || 0.1 || 10.0 || 11.9 || 21.9 || 5.4 || 4.0
|-
! scope="row" style="text-align:center" | 2011
|  || 15 || 11 || 0 || 0 || 100 || 91 || 191 || 56 || 32 || 0.0 || 0.0 || 9.1 || 8.3 || 17.4 || 5.1 || 2.9
|- style="background-color: #EAEAEA"
! scope="row" style="text-align:center" | 2012
|  || 15 || 2 || 0 || 0 || 3 || 10 || 13 || 2 || 3 || 0.0 || 0.0 || 1.5 || 5.0 || 6.5 || 1.0 || 1.5
|- class="sortbottom"
! colspan=3| Career
! 80
! 8
! 14
! 725
! 832
! 1557
! 428
! 257
! 0.1
! 0.2
! 9.1
! 10.4
! 19.5
! 5.4
! 3.2
|}

References

External links 

1985 births
Australian rules footballers from South Australia
Living people
Port Adelaide Football Club players
Port Adelaide Football Club players (all competitions)
Adelaide Football Club players
Central District Football Club players
Magarey Medal winners